Yaritayuq (yarita local name for Azorella compacta, Quechua -yuq a suffix to indicate ownership, "the one with the yarita", Hispanicized spelling Yaritalloc) is a mountain in the Andes of Peru, about  high. It is located in the Puno Region, Lampa Province, on the border of the districts of Palca and Paratia. Yaritayuq lies east of Yanawara.

References

Mountains of Puno Region
Mountains of Peru